Clair Engle (September 21, 1911July 30, 1964) was an American politician who served as a United States Senator from California from 1959 until his death in 1964. A member of the Democratic Party, he is best remembered for participating in the vote breaking the filibuster of the Civil Rights Act of 1964 in the U.S. Senate while partially paralyzed and unable to speak, shortly before his death from a brain tumor. Engle previously served in the California State Senate from January to August 1943 and U.S. House of Representatives from August 1943 until January 1959.

Early life

Engle was born in Bakersfield, to Fred Engle, a rancher who had been a teacher and a lawyer, and his wife, Carita. His parents named him after his aunt, who had assisted in his birth, and his name would become the source of many folksy stories over the years.

Like his two brothers, he was active in outdoor activities and attended public schools in Shasta and Tehama Counties. His fellow students at Red Bluff High School elected him their student body president.

In 1928, he enrolled at Chico State Teachers College, and he graduated in 1930. He then attended University of California Hastings College of the Law, and graduated in 1933. Although Engle had a reputation for straight-laced religiosity at both institutions, he eloped to marry his first wife, Hazel. They divorced in 1948 and Engle married his second wife, Lucretia Caldwell, a congressional secretary from San Jose.

Early career
Admitted to the California bar in 1933, Engle set up a practice in Corning and soon ran for District Attorney of Tehama County. Just 23 years old at the time of his victory, he would hold that office from 1934 to 1942.

In 1942, he won election to the California Senate, representing Tehama, Glenn and Colusa Counties but ended up serving in that body for little more than a few months. His main accomplishment was passing a law to allow the conversion of unused fairgrounds in order to house migrant farmworkers and ease a severe labor shortage.

U.S. Representative 

On August 31, 1943, Engle was elected as a Democrat to represent California's 2nd congressional district in the 78th Congress to fill the vacancy caused by the death of Harry Lane Englebright. Although the district had more Republican than Democratic voters, Englebright's widow and another candidate split the Republican vote.

Engle was elected to a full term in 1944 and re-elected to the following six Congresses, serving until January 3, 1959. At that time, the district consisted of 18 counties in northern California, and only the district in Nevada was physically larger. Thus, Engle used his pilot's license to campaign and meet with constituents. He was dubbed the "flying congressman" and once flew solo to his home in California from the Hybla Valley Airport in Alexandria, Virginia.

He was sometimes jokingly referred to as "Congressman Fireball" because of his activity, his colorful language, the location of the geologically active Mount Lassen in his district, and the clouds of smoke from his cigars.

In the U.S. House of Representatives he became Chairman of the U.S. House Committee on War Claims for the 79th Congress and Chairman of the U.S. House Committee on Interior and Insular Affairs for the 84th Congress and the 85th Congress.

He sponsored several major expansions of the California Central Valley Project as well as the Saline Water Conversion Research Program, and a low-interest loan program relating to small irrigation projects. He also became known as a key supporter of the Taft–Hartley Act, which did not prevent him from being nominated by both parties when he sought re-election.

U.S. Senator 
Engle won election as a Democrat to the U.S. Senate in 1958, the year of a Democratic landslide. He defeated the incumbent governor Goodwin J. Knight, thus becoming the first Democrat elected to that Senate seat in the 20th century. He succeeded William F. Knowland, who had given up the seat in an unsuccessful run for governor, losing to Pat Brown.

He began his term on January 3, 1959. He worked with Senator Thomas Kuchel to pass the San Luis water project, the West Coast powertie and the Point Reyes National Seashore. He also promoted federal public transit assistance and civil rights legislation to assist his urban constituents.

However, on August 24, 1963, Senator Engle underwent surgery to remove a brain tumor, which left him partially paralyzed, forcing him to miss several Senate sessions, and he ultimately withdrew from his re-election campaign. On April 13, 1964, the gravity of Engle's health problems was evident as he attempted to introduce a resolution calling for a delay in constructing the Bodega Bay Nuclear Power Plant at Bodega Head, located in Sonoma County. He was given permission to speak, but was unable; a colleague presented the resolution instead.

Engle officially ended his re-election campaign on April 28, 1964, just four days after undergoing his second brain operation in eight months. He chose not to endorse either of his Democratic challengers, California State Controller Alan Cranston and former presidential press secretary Pierre Salinger. That decision came because state Democratic leaders refused to endorse him unless he provided details concerning his health.

On June 10, 1964, during the roll call for the historic, successful effort to break the filibuster on what would become the Civil Rights Act of 1964, when the clerk reached "Mr. Engle", there was no reply. The tumor had robbed Engle of his ability to speak. Slowly lifting an arm, he pointed to his eye, thereby signaling his affirmative vote ("aye"). The cloture vote was 71–29, four votes more than the two thirds required to end the filibuster. Nine days later, the Senate approved the Act itself.

Death and legacy
Engle died in Washington, D.C., a month and a half later, aged 52. He was survived by his parents, his wife and his daughter from his first marriage, Yvonne Engle Childs. The Senate Chaplain led the memorial service at Fort Myer, Virginia, which Chief Justice Earl Warren attended. Approximately 3,000 mourners attended his funeral in Red Bluff at the First Methodist Church. He was buried in the Oak Hill cemetery.

Trinity Lake, in California's Trinity County, was renamed for him, but the name Trinity Lake continued to be commonly used; eventually, the lake's original name was officially restored. The city of Shasta Lake named a park and community center after him. His papers are held in the library at California State University, Chico.

See also
List of notable brain tumor patients
List of United States Congress members who died in office (1950–99)

References

External links
California State University, Chico, Clair Engle Collection, MSS 177, Special Collections, Meriam Library, California State University, Chico. California State University, Chico, Claire Engle Collection, MSS 177, Special Collections, Meriam Library.
University of California, Davis,  Department of Animal Science, Memorial Book Listing Clair Engle's legislative accomplishments 
Oral history interview 

1911 births
1964 deaths
Deaths from brain cancer in the United States
District attorneys in California
Democratic Party members of the United States House of Representatives from California
Politicians from Bakersfield, California
California State University, Chico alumni
University of California, Hastings College of the Law alumni
Democratic Party California state senators
Democratic Party United States senators from California
Deaths from brain cancer in Washington, D.C.
20th-century American lawyers
20th-century American politicians